Kathleen Schlesinger (1862, in Holywood, Ireland – 1953, in London) was a British music archaeologist and curator of musical instruments at the British Museum. She specialized in the history of musical instruments and was called in 1911 "the greatest authority on the subject". In 1939, her Greek Aulos presented her analysis of the modes used on aulos instruments in ancient Greek music.

She was editor of The Portfolio of Musical Archaeology. She was responsible for "practically all of the articles" about musical instruments in the Encyclopædia Britannica of 1911.

Bibliography

 Kathleen Schlesinger, The instruments of the modern orchestra & early records of the precursors of the violin family, with over 500 illustrations and plates, London:  W. Reeves, 1910. 
 --, A bibliography of musical instruments and archaeology, intended as a guide to the study of the history of musical instruments, London:  W. Reeves, 1912. 
 --, The Greek Aulos: A Study of Its Mechanism and of Its Relation to the Modal System of Ancient Greek Music, Followed by a Survey of the Greek Harmoniai in Survival Or Rebirth in Folk-music, Methuen, 1939

Notes

British musicologists
Women musicologists
British curators
Employees of the British Museum
1862 births
1953 deaths
British women curators
Music historians